The Noelmina Bridge is a bridge located in Noelmina Village, Takari District, Kupang Regency, East Nusa Tenggara. The Noelmina Bridge is the entrance gate to Kupang Regency from the South Central Timor Regency direction. This bridge is also a link between the City of Kupang and the Kupang Regency with South Central Timor Regency, North Central Timor Regency, Belu Regency, and Malaka Regency.

History
According to the IKAPTK Kupang, Noelmina Bridge was built in 1910 by Dutch East Indies Government. The workers are original Timorese who are forced to work aka used as labor mandatory. The residents were directed to collect stones and wood from the forest. The stone is used to build concrete foundations and wood to make bridge structures and trusses.

It is estimated that the Noelmina Bridge was built for 10 years and in 1920 the Noelmina Bridge was used. The purpose of the Noelmina bridge construction is so that people can it is easier to cross the Noelmina River to get to the center of the colonial government which is in Kupang. Also to facilitate the mobilization of the government from Kupang City. Because before the Noelmina bridge was built, they had to walk or ride horses.

During Japanese occupation, the Noelmina Bridge was used as the main mobility link between the Japanese headquarters in Kupang City to the Japanese army barracks in Atambua, Belu Regency. On February 19, 1944, the Noelmina Bridge was bombed by allied warplanes. The condition of the break in the Noelmina Bridge made the Japanese defenses in Timor Island weak and continued to receive attacks from the allied fleet until the end of the Japanese occupation of Timor.

At the end of 1945, the Noelmina Bridge was reconstructed to repair the former allied army bombing. And at the beginning of Indonesia's independence, the reconstruction of the Noelmina Bridge was strengthened by adding an arch construction to withstand the load of the bridge. At that time the Noelmina Bridge could only accommodate one vehicle traffic.

In 1987, right next to the old Noelmina Bridge, a new Noelmina Bridge was built using steel construction. The construction process lasted until 1989 or for 2 years. And right on March 14, 1990, The Noelmina Bridge was inaugurated by Vice President of the Republic of Indonesia, Sudharmono.

Description
The Noelmina Bridge is 240 meters long and 7 meters wide. The Noelmina Bridge is also the longest steel frame bridge in East Nusa Tenggara Province. Currently, the traces of the existence of the old bridge from the colonial era can still be seen, such as the former foundations that have been torn down and the edges of the old bridge.

References

 Kupang Regency
Buildings and structures in East Nusa Tenggara
Bridges in Indonesia
Bridges completed in 1920
Vertical lift bridges